Cristolț is a commune located in Sălaj County, Transylvania, Romania. It is composed of four villages: Cristolț, Muncel (Hegyköz), Poiana Onții (Bezdédmező) and Văleni (Szalonnavölgy).

Sights  
 Wooden Church in Poiana Onții, built in the 18th century (1780)

References

Communes in Sălaj County
Localities in Transylvania